Melinda Harper (born 1965) is an Australian abstract artist. She works with a variety of media including drawing, collage, photography, screen printing, painted objects and embroideries. Her work is characterised by the use of colours, stripes and geometrical designs.

Early life and career 
Harper was born in Darwin, Northern Territory in 1965. She says a visit to the National Gallery of Australia, in particular to its American Abstract Expressionist collection, was instrumental in her decision to become an artist. She studied at Prahran Art School, graduating with a Bachelor of Fine Arts with a major in painting.

Her first exhibition was held at Melbourne's Pinacotheca Gallery in 1987.

She was one of a small number of artists (including Kerrie Poliness, Rose Nolan and Stephen Bram) who set up Store 5, an artist-run exhibition space in High Street, Prahran in 1989.

Work

Major exhibitions 

Colour Sensation: The Works of Melinda Harper, Heide Museum of Modern Art (27 June 2015 - 25 October 2015)

Public collections 

 National Gallery of Victoria
 Art Gallery of New South Wales

References

Further reading 

 Sue Cramer, Anthony White, Rebecca Mayo and Judith Pascal, Colour Sensation: The Works of Melinda Harper, 2015.
 Ken McGregor and Jenny Zimmer, Melinda Harper, Macmillan Art Publishing, 2007.

External links 
 Melinda Harper works at National Gallery Victoria
 Melinda Harper works at Art Gallery of NSW
 Talking with painters, Episode 59: Melinda Harper

20th-century Australian women artists
20th-century Australian artists
21st-century Australian women artists
21st-century Australian artists
1965 births
Artists from Melbourne
Living people
Australian embroiderers